See No Evil is a 2006 slasher film directed by Gregory Dark, written by Dan Madigan, produced by Joel Simon, and starring professional wrestler Kane (Glenn Jacobs). It is the first major film produced by WWE Films and was released by Lionsgate on May 19, 2006.

The film went through many different working titles before the final title of See No Evil was chosen. The original working title of the film was Eye Scream Man, but was later changed to The Goodnight Man, then Goodnight before settling on See No Evil.

Plot
Officer Frank Williams and his partner Blaine investigate an abandoned house, where they find a young woman with her eyes ripped out. A large figure with an axe then murders Blaine and Frank has his arm chopped off before he is able to shoot the attacker in the head. Afterwards, detectives find seven bodies in the house, all of which have had their eyes ripped out.

Four years later, Frank and his partner Hannah take a group of delinquents - Christine, Kira, Michael, Tyson, Zoe, Melissa, Richie, and Russell to clean up the abandoned Blackwell Hotel in order to turn it into a homeless shelter, as explained by the owner Margaret.

That night, while Michael, Zoe, Russell, and Melissa go upstairs to the penthouse, Tyson and Richie decide to look for the previous owner's safe, and find what appears to be the body of a recently deceased man. Richie panics and runs off, only to be dragged into an elevator with a hook by Jacob Goodnight. When Margaret mentions the elevator is being used, Hannah goes to check on the group, but is killed in the elevator. Christine tries to help Kira escape the hotel, but Jacob attacks Kira with his hook and drags her into a dumbwaiter. Christine and Frank go upstairs to find the others, and run into Tyson who tells them what happened to Richie. Frank realizes it must be Jacob and is then pulled into the ceiling by the hook and killed.

Kira is held hostage by Jacob because of her religious tattoos, and is kept captive in a cage where she witnesses Richie having his eyes torn out. Melissa and Russell go off into a room on their own, but are chased by Jacob. Russell tries to lower Melissa out of a window, but he is killed by Jacob. Then, Jacob drops Melissa out the window. She survives her fall, but then she is killed by a pack of stray dogs. Jacob then attacks Michael and Zoe. Zoe nearly escapes from Jacob but her cell phone rings, alerting Jacob to her location. He subsequently kills her by forcing the cell phone down her throat. Michael finds Christine and Tyson as they try to rescue Kira, but they are attacked again by Jacob, who knocks out Michael while the other two escape up the elevator shaft.

The pair find Kira but are interrupted by Jacob before they can release her. Tyson creates a distraction but is electrocuted with his own taser and crushed with the bank vault. Margaret then shows up, and reveals herself as Jacob's mother, who lured Frank back to the hotel to get revenge on him for shooting her son, and explains the prisoners are merely a "bonus". Margaret attempts to shoot Kira, but Jacob intervenes and throws her headfirst into a nail on the wall. Michael reappears to help the girls battle Jacob, and the trio is eventually able to stab him through the eye with a pipe and throw him out of a window, where his heart is impaled by a shard of glass, apparently killing him.

Cast
Kane as Jacob Goodnight 
Christina Vidal as Christine Zarate 
Samantha Noble as Kira Vanning 
Luke Pegler as Michael Montross
Michael J. Pagan as Tyson Simms
Rachael Taylor as Zoe Warner
Penny McNamee as Melissa Beudroux
Craig Horner as Richie Bernson
Mikhael Wilder as Russell Wolf
Steven Vidler as Officer Frank Williams
Cecily Polson as Margaret Gayne
Tiffany Lamb as Hannah Anders
Sam Cotton as Young Jacob Goodnight
Corey Parker Robinson as Officer Blaine
Annalise Woods as Young Girl
Zoe Ventoura as Eyeless Woman

Reception

Box office
The film opened on May 19, 2006, and grossed $4.6 million from 1,257 theatres. It went on to gross $15 million at the U.S box office and $18.6 million overall, against a budget of $8 million.

Critical
The film received overwhelmingly negative reviews. Rotten Tomatoes gives it an 9% approval rating, based on 58 reviews, with an average rating of 3.3/10. The website's critics consensus states: "See No Evil is packed with cliches from countless other teen slasher films, making for a predictable, scare-free waste of time." According to Metacritic, which sampled 14 critics and calculated a weighted average score of 17 out of 100.

DVD release
See No Evil was released on DVD on November 28, 2006. The DVD included audio commentary by writer Dan Madigan, director Gregory Dark, co-executive producer Jed Blaugrund and Kane. The film eventually went on to make $45.16 million in 7 weeks.  In Australia, See No Evil was released on Wednesday May 28, 2008.

Sequel 

On August 6, 2013, WWE Studios announced a sequel to the film, with Kane reprising his role as Jacob Goodnight. The film was directed by the Soska Sisters, and starred Danielle Harris, Katharine Isabelle, Chelan Simmons, Kaj-Erik Eriksen, Greyston Holt, Lee Majdoub and Michael Eklund. Filming began on September 23 in Vancouver, British Columbia and ended on October 11, 2013. See No Evil 2 was released direct-to-DVD on October 21, 2014.

References

External links
 
 
 
 

2006 films
2006 horror films
2000s slasher films
2000s English-language films
Films directed by Gregory Dark
American serial killer films
Australian serial killer films
American slasher films
Australian slasher films
American action horror films
Australian action horror films
WWE Studios films
Lionsgate films
Films scored by Tyler Bates
Adventure horror films
Australian action adventure films
Films shot at Village Roadshow Studios
2000s American films